Chulcheh Qeshlaq (also Romanized as Chūlcheh Qeshlāq; also known as Choljah Qeshlāq, Choljeh Qeshlāq, Chooljeh Gheslagh, Chowlcheh Qeshlāq, Chowljeh Qeshlāq, and Chūljeh Qeshlāq) is a village in Ijrud-e Pain Rural District, Halab District, Ijrud County, Zanjan Province, Iran. At the 2006 census, its population was 142, in 40 families.

References 

Populated places in Ijrud County